Goetz von Berlichingen of the Iron Hand (German: Götz von Berlichingen zubenannt mit der eisernen Hand) is a 1925 German silent historical adventure film directed by Hubert Moest and starring Eugen Klöpfer, Friedrich Kühne and Paul Hartmann. It is an adaptation of the 1773 play Götz von Berlichingen by Johann Wolfgang von Goethe.

The film's sets were designed by the art director Gustav A. Knauer.

Cast
 Eugen Klöpfer as Götz von Berlichingen 
 Friedrich Kühne
 Paul Hartmann
 Theodor Loos
 Gertrude Welcker
 Erna Morena
 Lucie Höflich
 Grete Reinwald
 Leopold von Ledebur
 Olaf Fjord
 Lothar Müthel
 Fritz Kampers
 Maria Forescu
 Albert Steinrück
 Fritz Rasp
 Hans Brausewetter
 Eduard von Winterstein
 Fritz Greiner
 Kurt Wolowsky
 Richard Ludwig
 Karl Victor Plagge
 Robert Leffler

References

Bibliography
 Goble, Alan. The Complete Index to Literary Sources in Film. Walter de Gruyter, 1999.

External links

1925 films
Films of the Weimar Republic
Films directed by Hubert Moest
German silent feature films
1920s historical adventure films
German historical adventure films
German films based on plays
Films based on works by Johann Wolfgang von Goethe
Films set in the 16th century
Films set in the Holy Roman Empire
Silent historical adventure films
1920s German films